Jenkins is a home rule-class city in Letcher County, Kentucky, United States. The population was 2,203 as of the 2010 census.

History

In autumn of 1911, the Consolidation Coal Company purchased the current location of Jenkins as part of a  tract of land in Pike, Letcher, and Floyd counties from the Northern Coal and Coke Company. After the acquisition was finalized, plans were made to extend the Lexington and Eastern Railroad from Jackson to a town named McRoberts. The plans also included the establishment of the town of Jenkins for George C. Jenkins, one of the Consolidation Coal Company's directors.

Because of the need of hundreds of homes and other structures, nine sawmills and two brickyards were erected. A dynamo was built to temporarily generate power for the houses. Next, a temporary narrow-gauge railroad was built over Pine Mountain from Glamorgan, Virginia, in order to carry supplies to further the development of the town. Jenkins's city government was established as soon as the businesses and land were put up for sale. The company even went as far to supply the town with its own marshals to enforce the law. Jenkins was finally incorporated as a sixth-class city on January 9, 1912.

Jenkins was home to minor league baseball from 1948 to 1951. The Jenkins Cavaliers played as members of the Class D level Mountain States League. Jenkins played home games at the Jenkins Athletic Field.

In 1956, Consolidation Coal sold Jenkins to Bethlehem Steel. Bethlehem Steel closed the mine in 1988.

Diana Baldwin and Anita Cherry are believed to have been the first women to work inside an American coal mine, and were the first women to work inside a mine who were members of the United Mine Workers of America. They began that work in 1973 in Jenkins.

During the Southeast Kentucky floods of 2020, water spilled over the top of the Elkhorn Lake dam above Jenkins, which is considered one of Kentucky's most dangerous. About 30 percent of Jenkins is vulnerable to flooding in the event of a dam break, and the town lacks a comprehensive emergency plan.

Geography
Jenkins is located in eastern Letcher County at  (37.179914, -82.632148). Its southern border is the Kentucky–Virginia state line, following the crest of Pine Mountain.

U.S. Route 23 passes through Jenkins, leading north  to Pikeville and south over Pine Mountain  to Norton, Virginia. U.S. Route 119 leads southwest from Jenkins  to Whitesburg, the Letcher county seat, and north with US 23 to Pikeville.

The city is in the valley of Elkhorn Creek, a northeast-flowing tributary of the Russell Fork, part of the Levisa Fork–Big Sandy River watershed flowing north to the Ohio River.

Demographics

As of the census of 2000, there were 2,401 people, 968 households, and 671 families residing in the city. The racial makeup of the city was 97.96% White, 1.08% African American, 0.08% Native American, 0.33% Asian, 0.08% Pacific Islander, and 0.46% from two or more races. Hispanic or Latino of any race were 0.29% of the population.

There were 968 households, out of which 31.7% had children under the age of 18 living with them, 52.9% were married couples living together, 13.2% had a female householder with no husband present, and 30.6% were non-families. 27.5% of all households were made up of individuals, and 12.9% had someone living alone who was 65 years of age or older. The average household size was 2.43 and the average family size was 2.97.

In the city, the population was spread out, with 25.4% under the age of 18, 8.4% from 18 to 24, 26.8% from 25 to 44, 24.7% from 45 to 64, and 14.7% who were 65 years of age or older. The median age was 38 years. For every 100 females, there were 92.2 males. For every 100 females age 18 and over, there were 83.7 males.

The median income for a household in the city was $20,143, and the median income for a family was $25,985. Males had a median income of $31,087 versus $21,333 for females. The per capita income for the city was $11,358. About 24.6% of families and 29.9% of the population were below the poverty line, including 43.3% of those under age 18 and 14.6% of those age 65 or over.

Education
Jenkins has a lending library, a branch of the Letcher County Library.

Arts and culture
The David A. Zegeer Coal-Railroad Museum is housed in town in a historic railroad depot.

Jenkins Homecoming Days is an annual festival usually celebrated in August.

Notable people
Kenny Baker, fiddle player and member of Bluegrass Boys
Matt Figger, basketball head coach at Austin Peay University
Darwin K. Kyle, Medal of Honor recipient
Francis Gary Powers, pilot whose CIA U-2 spy plane was shot down while flying a reconnaissance mission over Soviet Union airspace; dramatized in Steven Spielberg's film Bridge of Spies
Gary Stewart, country musician and songwriter
Milt Ticco, All-American basketball player at University of Kentucky and early professional in National Basketball League

References

External links

 Thayer's Gazetteer: Jenkins, Kentucky
 The Guide to the Jenkins, Kentucky Photographic collection, 1911–1930 housed at the University of Kentucky Archives.

Cities in Kentucky
Cities in Letcher County, Kentucky
Populated places established in 1912
Company towns in Kentucky
Mining communities in Kentucky
1912 establishments in Kentucky